Clemente Palacios Santos (born 24 October 1993) is a Colombian footballer who plays as a forward for Alianza Petrolera in the Categoría Primera A.

References

Living people
1993 births
People from Antioquia
Colombian footballers
Categoría Primera A players
Once Caldas footballers
Barranquilla F.C. footballers
Atlético Junior footballers
Alianza Petrolera players
Association football forwards